Elhanan Rosenstein (אלחנן ראזענשטיין in his Yiddish spelling; 1796–1869), son of the Rabbi Zanvil Rosenstein of Bonn and father of the physician Samuel Siegmund Rosenstein, was a rabbi who served in Berlin from 1846 until 1869. Despite being a writer and having a high position in the German Jewish community, Rosenstein was known in his time as being an inarticulate orator in German.

References

1796 births
1869 deaths
German male writers
Rabbis from Berlin
Jewish writers